Demirtaş is a village in the central district of Hakkâri Province in Turkey. The village is populated by Kurds of different tribal composition and had a population of 580 in 2022.

The hamlets of Kuşlu, Oluklu, Örencik and Yağmurlu are attached to Demirtaş.

Tribes that reside in Demirtaş include Oramar and Pinyanişî.

Population 
Population history from 2000 to 2022:

References 

Kurdish settlements in Hakkâri Province
Villages in Hakkâri District